The 1958 Big Ten Conference football season was the 63rd season of college football played by the member schools of the Big Ten Conference and was a part of the 1958 NCAA University Division football season.

The 1958 Iowa Hawkeyes football team, under head coach Forest Evashevski, won the Big Ten football championship and was ranked No. 2 in the final AP and UPI polls, both taken before the bowl games. After defeating California, 38–12, in the 1959 Rose Bowl, the Hawkeyes were voted national champion by the Football Writers Association of America in its post-bowl ranking. Iowa quarterback Randy Duncan won the Chicago Tribune Silver Football trophy as the Big Ten's most valuable player, was a consensus first-team All-American, and finished second in the 1958 voting for the Heisman Trophy.

The 1958 Wisconsin Badgers football team, under head coach Milt Bruhn, finished in second place in the Big Ten with a 7–1–1 record, led the conference in scoring defense (8.6 points allowed per game), and was ranked No. 7 in the final AP Poll. Wisconsin's sole loss was to Iowa. Dale Hackbart led the Badgers with 641 passing yards and 1,032 yards of total offense.

The 1958 Ohio State Buckeyes football team, under head coach Woody Hayes, compiled a 6–1–2 record and was ranked No. 8 in the final AP Poll. Fullback Bob White was a consensus first-team All-American and led the Big Ten with 859 rushing yards and 72 points scored. End Jim Houston and tackle Jim Marshall were also selected as first-team All-Americans by multiple selectors.

Other notable individual performances during the 1958 season include Michigan State end Sam Williams who was selected as a consensus first-team All-American and Illinois end Rich Kreitling who led the Big Ten with 688 receiving yards.

Season overview

Results and team statistics

Key
AP final = Team's rank in the final AP Poll of the 1958 season
AP high = Team's highest rank in the AP Poll throughout the 1958 season
PPG = Average of points scored per game
PAG = Average of points allowed per game
MVP = Most valuable player as voted by players on each team as part of the voting process to determine the winner of the Chicago Tribune Silver Football trophy; trophy winner in bold

Preseason
Phil Dickens was hired by Indiana as its head football coach in 1957 but was suspended by the NCAA for recruiting violations.  Accordingly, the 1958 season was Dickens' first as Indiana's head coach.

Regular season

Bowl games

On January 1, 1959, Iowa defeated the California Golden Bears, 38–12, in the 1959 Rose Bowl. Iowa halfback Bob Jeter was named the Rose Bowl player of the game. Iowa finished No. 2 in the AP and UPI polls taken prior to the bowl games, but was named national champion in the FWAA poll taken after the bowl games.

Post-season developments
On November 14, 1958, Bennie Oosterbaan resigned as Michigan's head football coach with two games remaining in the program's worst season since 1936. Bump Elliott, who had been Michigan's backfield coach for two years, was hired to replace him.

Statistical leaders

The Big Ten's individual statistical leaders for the 1958 season included the following:

Passing yards

Rushing yards

Receiving yards

Total yards

Scoring

Awards and honors

All-Big Ten honors

The following players were picked by the Associated Press (AP) and/or the United Press International (UPI) as first-team players on the 1958 All-Big Ten Conference football team.

All-American honors

At the end of the 1958 season, Big Ten players secured three of the 12 consensus first-team picks on the 1958 College Football All-America Team. The Big Ten's consensus All-Americans were:

Other Big Ten players who were named first-team All-Americans by at least one selector were:

Other awards

Two Big Ten players finished among the top five in the voting for the 1958 Heisman Trophy: Iowa quarterback Randy Duncan (second); and Ohio State fullback Bob White (fourth).

1959 NFL Draft
The following Big Ten players were among the first 100 picks in the 1959 NFL Draft:

References